Thunderbird Bay is a census-designated place (CDP) in Brown County in central Texas, United States. The population was 663 at the 2010 census.

Geography
Thunderbird Bay is located in north-central Brown County along the northern arm of Lake Brownwood, a reservoir on Pecan Bayou.

Demographics

2020 census

As of the 2020 United States census, there were 764 people, 357 households, and 141 families residing in the CDP.

References

Census-designated places in Brown County, Texas
Census-designated places in Texas